is the 31st studio album by Japanese singer-songwriter Miyuki Nakajima, released in November 2003.

The lead-off track of the album "Ride on the Silver Dragon's Back" was featured as a theme song for the television drama series Dr. Coto's Clinic first aired on Fuji TV in July 2003. A song was released as a single prior to the album, debuted at the number-four on the Oricon and remained on the chart for over 10 months.  The album also includes her own rendition of the song "Kiss Old Memories Goodbye" which was initially recorded and released as a single by Kou Shibasaki. Original recording by Shibasaki was also featured on Dr.Coto which she acted the role of nurse.

Some of the songs on the album like "Mirage Hotel" and "The Mistress' Testimony" were also performed on her musical Yakai Vol.14 "24-Ji Chaku 0-Ji Hatsu", which was mounted at the Bunkamura Theatre Cocoon in January 2004 and later released on DVD.

Track listing
All songs written and composed by Miyuki Nakajima, arranged by Ichizo Seo
"" – 6:16
"" – 4:35
"" – 5:21
"The Mirage Hotel" – 6:59
"" – 5:45
"" – 5:10
"Nightcap Special" – 5:06
"" – 5:21
"" [Album version] – 6:38
"" – 5:38

Personnel
Miyuki Nakajima – Lead and harmony vocals
Vinnie Colaiuta – Drums
Neil Stubenhaus – Electric bass
Michael Thompson – Electric guitar, acoustic guitar
Masayoshi Furukawa – Electric guitar
Jon Gilutin – Acoustic piano, electric piano, hammond organ, keyboards, hammond organ
Ichizo Seo – Keyboards
Elton Nagata – Keyboards
Keishi Urata – Synth programming, drum loop, percussion programming
Tomō Satō – Synth programming, acoustic guitar, drum loop, percussion programming
Suzie Katayama – Strings conductor
Sid Page – Violin (Concertmaster)
Joel Derouin – Violin (Concertmaster)
Eve Butler – Violin
Darius Campo – Violin
Susan Chatman – Violin
Mario De Leon – Violin
Bruce Dukov – Violin
Alyssa Park – Violin
Armen Garabedian – Violin
Benj Garabedian – Violin
Cameron Patrlck – Violin
Michele Richards – Violin
Charlie Bisharat – Violin
Peter Kent – Violin
Ruth Bruegger-Johnson – Violin
Bob Peterson – Violin
Josefina Vergara – Violin
Mark Robertson – Violin
Miwako Watanabe – Violin
John Wittenberg – Violin
Larry Corbett – Cello
Dan Smith – Cello
Stefanie Fife – Cello
Steve Richards – Cello
Rudy Stein – Cello
Bob Becker – Viola
Darrin McCann – Viola
Fumikazu Miyashita- Vocals
Kazuyo Sugimoto – Harmony vocals
Julia Waters – Backing vocals
Maxine Waters – Backing vocals
Oren Waters – Backing vocals
Carmen Twillie – Backing vocals
Maxi Anderson – Backing vocals

Chart positions

Album

Single

Release history

References

Miyuki Nakajima albums
2003 albums